Noisy-le-Sec is a railway station in Noisy-le-Sec, Seine-Saint-Denis, France. The station opened in 1849 and is on the Paris-Est–Strasbourg-Ville railway and Paris-Est–Mulhouse-Ville railway. The station is served by RER Line E services operated by the SNCF and Île-de-France tramway Line 1, operated by RATP Group. The station has long functioned as an important depot and marshalling yard, making it a major railway node.

The original station opened in the year 1849 with the first part of the railway line from Paris-Est to Strasbourg-Ville and was enlarged in 1910. During the first World War, it was an important station for transporting troops to the front lines. Following World War II, the station was rebuilt and later modified for the commencement of RER services in 1999.  The Tramway Line 1 extension to Noisy-le-Sec opened in the month of December 2003.

Train services
The station is served by the following services:

Commuter services (RER E) Haussmann–Saint-Lazare–Chelles–Gournay
Commuter services (RER E) Haussmann–Saint-Lazare–Tournan

Gallery

External links

 

Réseau Express Régional stations
Railway stations in Seine-Saint-Denis
Railway stations in France opened in 1849